The 1904 South Australian Football Association season was the 28th season of the top-level Australian rules football competition in South Australia.

Ladder

Finals Series

Grand Final 

1904 SAFA Grand Final

References 

SAFA
South Australian National Football League seasons